"The Trolley Song" is a song written by Hugh Martin and Ralph Blane and made famous by Judy Garland in the 1944 film Meet Me in St. Louis. In a 1989 NPR interview, Blane said the song was inspired by a picture of a trolleycar in a turn-of-the-century newspaper. In 1974, he had said the picture was in a book he had found at the Beverly Hills Public Library and was captioned "'Clang, Clang, Clang,' Went the Trolley."

Blane and Martin were nominated for the Academy Award for Best Original Song at the 1945 Academy Awards, for "The Trolley Song" but lost to "Swinging on a Star" from Going My Way. "The Trolley Song" was ranked #26 by the American Film Institute in 2004 on the AFI's 100 Years...100 Songs list. The song as conducted by Georgie Stoll for Meet Me in St. Louis has a very complex, evocative arrangement by Conrad Salinger featuring harmonized choruses, wordless vocals, and short highlights or flourishes from a wide range of orchestral instruments.

It has been claimed for years when the song was recorded on the set of Meet Me in St Louis, it was done in a single shot, and also that Garland accidentally repeated a verse instead of singing the next verse, but songs in Hollywood musicals of that era were not recorded on set. They were prerecorded in a studio and lip-synched by the artists. The number in the film consists of far more than one shot, and there is no repeated verse. It was recorded on April 21, 1944 at Decca Studios on Melrose Avenue, Los Angeles, California.

Covers
Five versions of the song charted in 1944-45. Garland's single and a version by the Vaughn Monroe Orchestra—sung as a duet by Monroe and Marilyn Duke—both peaked at number four, but the biggest hit version was by the Pied Pipers, which hit number two on Billboard magazine's "Best Sellers in Stores" chart the week of December 16, 1944.
Instrumental versions of the song were used in the scores of several MGM animated shorts, arranged by Scott Bradley, including Swing Shift Cinderella (1945) and the Tom and Jerry shorts Cat Fishin''' (1947) and Old Rockin' Chair Tom'' (1948).
One of the Extra Credits videos, it sang the song but it parodizes the trolley problem
In 2021, Randy Rainbow covered the song in a political parody YouTube version called "Clang Clang Clang went Josh Hawley", about Missouri Senator Josh Hawley.

See also
List of train songs

References

1944 songs
1944 singles
Judy Garland songs
Songs about trains
Songs from Meet Me in St. Louis
Songs written by Hugh Martin
Songs written by Ralph Blane
Vaughn Monroe songs